Wu Qi (440–381 BC) was a Chinese military leader, Legalist philosopher, and politician in the Warring States period.

Biography
Born in the State of Wey, he was skilled in leading armies and military strategy. He had served in the states of Lu and Wei (魏, not to be confused with Wèi, currently spelled as Wey as in previous note). In the state of Wei he commanded many great battles and was appointed Xihe Shou (Mayor of Xihe county). Xihe was the area between the Yellow and Luo Rivers that Wei had just taken from Qin. Later, after he became estranged from the lord of Wei and was forced into exile, Wu Qi went to the State of Chu where he was appointed Prime minister by King Dao of Chu. His reforms made Chu a strong state at that time. The reforms he instituted enraged the old nobility of Chu and he was killed after the death of King Dao.

Wu's reforms, which started around 389 BC, were generally aimed at changing the corrupt and inefficient government. The nobility and officialdom were terribly corrupt and the government was burdened with the costs of paying them and a horde of other minor officials. Wu first lowered the annual salary of Chu officials, then dismissed officials who were useless or incompetent. He also eliminated hereditary privileges after three generations. The money saved by cutting costs was used to create and train a more professional army.

Another of Wu's actions was to move all the nobles to the borders on the frontier, away from the capital, in order to reduce their power and at the same time populate those areas, making them more useful to the state government. He is also credited with devising a set of building codes in Ying, in order to make the city look less "barbaric", and more in line with 'civilized' Chinese architectural aesthetics.

Although his reforms soon started to make Chu a powerful country, the nobles and Daoists of Chu hated him. Nobles accused him of trying to change the old ways, and even managed to find fault with the building codes. Daoists accused him of being a "warmonger" and an "admirer of force and weaponry", even going as far as to say that he was "a threat to humanity". He was accused of not returning for the mourning period of his mother's death and for murdering his own wife (who was the daughter of a noble from the rival state of Qi) in order to gain trust from the ruler of the state of Lu.  There is no definitive evidence to the truth of these accusations, and it is possible  they were manufactured by Wu Qi's political enemies to slander him.

In the wake of Wu Qi's reforms, Chu's prowess was quickly manifest: Chu defeated the Yue state in the south and the Wei in the north, dealing with each in quick succession. However, King Dao died that same year. The old nobles plotted to assassinate Wu Qi at King Dao's funeral, where he would be separated from the army. Wu Qi spotted the assassins armed with bows, and rushed to the side of King Dao's body. He was killed, but many arrows struck the dead King. The new King Su, furious at his father's body being mutilated, ordered all nobles involved to be executed, along with their families.

Wei Liaozi

According to the Wei Liaozi, a treatise on military matters dating from the late 4th or early 3rd century BC, the general Wu Qi was once offered a sword by his subordinates on the eve of battle. However Wu Qi refused to accept the weapon on the basis that banners and drums, the tools to lead and command, were the only instruments a general required. In his words, "to command the troops and direct their blades, this is the role of a commander. To wield a single sword is not his role." The point here is to highlight the idea that the general was the brain of the army, whereas the soldiers were to behave as the limbs. Heroic individual actions were disincentivized in preference to complete obedience and perfect coordination as a unit, a concept which the Wei Liaozi elucidates upon in another parable concerning Wu Qi: Prior to the beginning of a battle, one of Wu's soldiers broke from his ranks in his enthusiasm and charged the enemy line, slaying two men, and trotted back to his former position along with their heads as trophies. Wu immediately ordered the man to be put to death. When his officers protested that he was a fine warrior, Wu Qi answered, "He is indeed a fine warrior, but he disobeyed my orders." As with Sun Tzu and his Art of War, Wu Qi emphasized discipline and obedience before bravery as the most important traits in soldiery.

Popular culture 
He and Sun Zi are often mentioned in the same sentence (Sun-Wu, 孙吴) as great military strategists of similar if not equal importance.

His military treatise, the Wuzi, is included as one of the Seven Military Classics. It is said there were two books on the art of war by Wu Qi, but one was lost, hence leaving the Wuzi as the only existing book carrying Wu Qi's military thoughts.

Wu Qi is one of the 32 historical figures who appear as special characters in the video game series Romance of the Three Kingdoms (video game) by Koei.

See also 
 Wuqi County

Footnotes

References

 Wu, Rongzeng, "Wu Qi". Encyclopedia of China (Chinese History Edition), 1st ed.
 Zhang, Lirong, "Wu Qi". Encyclopedia of China (Military Edition), 1st ed.

External links
 

380s BC deaths
Zhou dynasty philosophers
4th-century BC Chinese philosophers
Ancient Chinese military writers
Zhou dynasty generals
Year of birth unknown
Chinese reformers
Chinese chancellors
Writers from Heze
Legalism (Chinese philosophy)
Philosophers of law
Philosophers from Shandong
Zhou dynasty politicians
Politicians from Heze
Generals from Shandong
Lingyin of Chu